Otto Weber (4 June 1902 – 19 October 1966) was a German theologian. Weber was born in Mülheim, Cologne, and studied at Bonn and Tübingen. In 1933, he joined the Nazi Party and was for a short time a member of the German Christians group. In 1934, Weber became professor at the University of Göttingen. He opposed the witness of the Confessing Church, and after the war felt a strong sense of guilt for his involvement with Nazi Germany. His 1955 work, The Foundations of Dogmatics is one of the most influential Reformed theological works of the twentieth century. Jürgen Moltmann describes him as an "expert teacher" and a "compelling preacher".

References

1902 births
1966 deaths
20th-century Calvinist and Reformed theologians
German Calvinist and Reformed theologians
20th-century German Protestant theologians
Academic staff of the University of Göttingen
Clergy from Cologne
Nazi Party members
University of Tübingen alumni
University of Bonn alumni
German male non-fiction writers